Football at the 2009 Asian Youth Games was held from 20 June to 6 July 2009 at the Jalan Besar Stadium. The organizers also used few other college stadiums for the preliminary rounds, Temasek Polytechnic, Meridian Junior College, Victoria Junior College and Jurong Junior College. Age limit for the teams was under-14. South Korea won the gold medal after beating North Korea 2–0 in the final.

Philippines and Hong Kong withdrew after their teams underwent quarantine due to players testing positive for H1N1 amidst a pandemic of the disease.

Medalists

Results

Preliminary round 

 Host Singapore directly entered the final round.

Group A 

 The Philippines has been withdrawn from the Asian Youth Games Football Competition as they were unable to fulfil their fixtures as scheduled due to their team's quarantine.

Group B

Group C

Group D 

 Hong Kong has been withdrawn from the Asian Youth Games Football Competition as they were unable to fulfil their fixtures as scheduled due to their team's quarantine.

Second-placed teams

Final round

Group A

Group B

Knockout round

Semifinals

Bronze medal match

Final

Goalscorers

References

External links
 Official site

Football
2009 in Asian football
2009 in Singaporean football
2009